Christine Axsmith (born 1964) is an American academic, author, lawyer who has specialized in computer security and elder law.

Axsmith was allegedly fired by BAE Systems for posting on a CIA blog that "waterboarding is torture, and torture is wrong".

Biography 
Axsmith graduated from Drexel University in 1987. She then attended the Columbus School of Law at The Catholic University of America, graduating in 1990. 

In 1993, Axsmith was granted a top secret security clearance by the government. She would work for the US State Department and the National Counterterrorism Center.  Axsmith also worked on the United Nations Commission on International Trade Law in the Electronic Commerce Working Group.

In 2006. while working for BAE Systems, a CIA contractor, Axsmith posted on   an internal top secret CIA blog about the immorality of torture and waterboarding in particular.  In July of that year, she was fired.  Axsmith claims that her firing was in retribution for her posting.  BAE Systems refused to answer that charge.   She was also stripped of her security clearance.

In January 2007. Axsmith started practiced elder law and real estate law in the District of Columbia, continuing until July 2017. 

Axsmith sits on the Fiduciary Panel for the Superior Court of the District of Columbia where she represents the elderly and disabled. Since 2017, she has been a writer for $uccess Without College Publications in Charlotte, North Carolina.

Publications 

 Axsmith has been published by the International Bar Association, the Massachusetts Institute of Technology (MIT) and the American Bar Association. 
 Her research is included in an annotated bibliography published by the World Bank entitled "International Initiatives Towards Harmonisation in the field of Funds Transfers, Payments, Payment Systems, and Securities Settlements."
 Through her work with the American Bar Association, Axsmith was published at the Computers, Freedom and Privacy Conference at MIT.

References

1964 births
Living people
Central Intelligence Agency
BAE Systems people
American women bloggers
American bloggers
Drexel University alumni
Columbus School of Law alumni
21st-century American women